The Friend of Peace or Friend of Peace of the International Tree of Peace Project (Slovak: Priateľ mieru) is an honorary title and honourable mention awarded since 2020 by Servare et Manere, the Slovak non-governmental organization. This is one of the awards this organization can award for personalities who treasure peace, freedom and mutual understanding and acknowledge the importance of initiatives which serve to enhance the welfare of everyone in society. Servare et Manere honour al those who have made a special contribution to the promotion of understanding between peoples and the bringing together of nations.

Background 
Servare et Manere is the founder of an international initiative called Tree of Peace (Slovak: Strom pokoja, Russian: Дерево мира, German: Der Friedensbaum) which is an international project that originated in Slovakia. The project was created on the occasion of the 100th Anniversary of the end of World War I. The main goal of the project is to promote a message of peace by planting the Tree of Peace on every continent. The Tree of Peace officially represents the Slovak Republic under the brand “DOBRÝ NÁPAD SLOVENSKO – GOOD IDEA SLOVAKIA”, under which Slovakia as a country is presented at home and abroad. This initiative is also implemented with the support of the Ministry of Foreign and European Affairs of the Slovak Republic. So far (2020), thirteen Trees of Peace have been planted in important places regarding world history. Six trees have been planted in Slovakia and others in Germany, Serbia, Austria, Poland, Russia, the United States and the United Kingdom. Planted tree in United States has an official Congressional Record of the proceedings and debates of the United States Congress, published in Washington, Thursday, June 20, 2019, Vol. 165, No. 104.

Friend of Peace 
Friend of Peace is an honorary title that for laureates does not imply any obligations. By receiving this title and award, personalities expresses support for the international project Tree of Peace in country of their birth. This honour may also be associated with exclusive Patronage over the Project in a particular country. The number of laureates is not limited. Laureates are entered in a special register. The award was established on January 1, 2020.

List of laureates 

 Dagmar Havlová, former First Lady of the Czech Republic, actress and founder of the VIZE 97 Foundation.
Archduke Markus Habsburg-Lothringen, great-grandson of Emperor Franz Joseph I of Austria and a member of the Tuscan line of the House of Habsburg.
Empress Farah Pahlavi, Shahbanu of Iran.
Soane Patita Paini Cardinal Mafi, Roman Catholic Bishop of Tonga. 
His Majesty King Simeon II.
His Majesty Kiingi Tuheitia Pootatau Te Wherowhero VII, the current Maaori King in New Zealand.
Sir Iakoba Taeia Italeli CMT, GCMG the former Governor-General of Tuvalu.
Sir David Suchet, CBE.
Grand Ducal House of Mecklenburg-Strelitz.

See also 
Tree of Peace Memorial Plaque

References

External links 

 

Awards established in 2020
International awards
Peace awards